Bob Williams was an American football coach. He served as the head football coach at the Livingston State Teachers College (now the University of West Alabama) in 1952. During his one season there, he compiled an overall record of four wins and six losses (4–6).

Head coaching record

References

Year of birth missing
Year of death missing
West Alabama Tigers football coaches